Gratallops is a municipality in the comarca of the Priorat in Catalonia, Spain.

What brings the most fame to the village is that it has been a focal point for the reemergence of high quality wines from the Priorat region.  Within its borders, Gratallops lays claim to no less than 23 officially certified cellars including some of the most famous in Spain such as: Álvaro Palacios, Clos Mogador, Clos de l'Obac, Clos Erasmus, and Mas Martinet.

References

 Panareda Clopés, Josep Maria; Rios Calvet, Jaume; Rabella Vives, Josep Maria (1989). Guia de Catalunya, Barcelona: Caixa de Catalunya.  (Spanish).  (Catalan).

External links
Official website
 Government data pages 

Municipalities in Priorat
Populated places in Priorat